The following is a list of Portuguese film directors.

A
Alberto Seixas Santos
Alexandre Valente
António Campos
António de Macedo
António da Cunha Telles
António Ferreira
António Lopes Ribeiro
António de Macedo
António-Pedro Vasconcelos
Armando de Miranda
Arthur Duarte

B
Bruno Gascon

C
Chianca de Garcia

D
David Bonneville

E
Edgar Pêra
Eduardo Geada
Eduardo Guedes

F
Fernando Fragata
Fernando Lopes
Fernando Vendrell

G
Glauber Rocha

J
João Botelho
João Canijo
João César Monteiro
João Mário Grilo
João Ponces de Carvalho
João Pedro Rodrigues
João Salaviza
Joaquim Leitão
Joaquim Sapinho
Jorge Brum do Canto
José Álvaro Morais
José Fonseca e Costa

L
Leitão de Barros
Leonel Vieira
Luís Filipe Rocha

M
Manuel da Fonseca
Manoel de Oliveira
Manuel Mozos
Marco Martins
Maria de Medeiros
Mário Barroso
Miguel Gomes

P
Paulo Rocha
Pedro Costa
Perdigão Queiroga

R
Raquel Freire
Rita Azevedo Gomes

T
Tiago Guedes

Portuguese
 
Film directors